F9F may refer to:
 Grumman F9F Panther jet fighter (straight wing)
 Grumman F9F Cougar jet fighter (swept wing development of the Panther)